The Limejuice Mystery or Who Spat in Grandfather's Porridge? is a 1930 British marionette film directed by Jack Harrison.

Plot summary 
The film begins in a Chinese opium den, where a woman is forced to dance. The customers begin to dance along and play musical instruments. In their inebriation, they begin a fight, and one of them pulls out a gun, proceeding to kill almost everyone. The police are called in. Herlock Sholmes (a parody of Sherlock Holmes) is called to solve a murder mystery at a bar.

Soundtrack 
 "For He's a Jolly Good Fellow"

External links 
 
 

1930 animated films
Marionette films
British comedy mystery films
British animated short films
Sherlock Holmes films
1930 short films
1930s comedy mystery films
1930 films
British black-and-white films
1930 comedy films
1930s English-language films
1930s British films